Maglass is a townland in the parish of Ballymacelligott, which is situated between two towns, Tralee and Castleisland, County Kerry, Ireland. Ballymacelligott is the biggest parish in Munster. Maglass is a farming area, with the nearest shop and post office is approximately 1 mile from Maglass in Ballydwyer. The nearest church is a further mile in Clogher, where there is also a National School.

Archaeology
The townland has an earthwork, 2 ringforts and a fulacht fiadh listed in the Archaeological Survey Database.

See also
 List of townlands of County Kerry

References

Townlands of County Kerry